Steve Austin (born Steven James Anderson; December 18, 1964), better known by his ring name "Stone Cold" Steve Austin, is an American media personality, actor, and retired professional wrestler. Widely regarded as one of the greatest and most influential professional wrestlers of all time, he was integral to the development and success of the World Wrestling Federation (WWF, now known as WWE) during the Attitude Era, an industry boom period in the late 1990s and early 2000s.

Austin began his professional wrestling career in 1989, after playing college football at the University of North Texas. He signed with World Championship Wrestling (WCW) in 1991 and adopted the persona of "Stunning" Steve Austin, a villainous in-ring technician, and he won the WCW World Television Championship and the WCW United States Heavyweight Championship twice each, alongside the WCW World Tag Team Championship and NWA World Tag Team Championship once each with Brian Pillman (as the Hollywood Blondes). After a brief stint in Extreme Championship Wrestling (ECW), Austin signed with World Wrestling Federation (WWF, now WWE) in 1995.

In the WWF, Austin was repackaged as a short-tempered, brash, anti-establishment antihero named "Stone Cold" Steve Austin, becoming the most popular wrestler of the Attitude Era off the back of his feud with company chairman Mr. McMahon. He won the WWF Championship six times, the WWF Intercontinental Championship twice, the Million Dollar Championship once, and the WWF Tag Team Championship four times, making him the fifth WWF Triple Crown Champion. He is also a record three-time Royal Rumble winner, won the 1996 King of the Ring, and headlined multiple WWF pay-per-view events, including WrestleMania (its flagship event) four times. He was forced to retire from in-ring competition in 2003 after multiple knee injuries and a serious neck injury at the 1997 SummerSlam event, making sporadic appearances ever since. He was inducted into the WWE Hall of Fame in 2009, and returned for a one-off match against Kevin Owens at WrestleMania 38 in April 2022.

Austin hosts the podcast The Steve Austin Show (2013–present) and the WWE video podcast Broken Skull Sessions (2019–present). He collaborates with El Segundo Brewing on Broken Skull IPA and Broken Skull American Lager. He also hosted the reality competition series Steve Austin's Broken Skull Challenge (2014–2017) and Straight Up Steve Austin (2019–present).

Early life
Austin was born Steven James Anderson in Austin, Texas, on December 18, 1964. His parents, Beverly (née Harrison) and James Anderson, divorced when he was around a year old. His mother moved to Edna, Texas, where Austin would spend most of his childhood, and she married Ken Williams in 1968. Austin adopted his stepfather's surname and legally changed his name to Steven James Williams, though he would legally change it again to Steve Austin later in life. He has a younger sister named Jennifer and three brothers named Scott, Kevin, and Jeff. Kevin is less than a year younger than Austin, leading Austin to theorize in his autobiography that their father may have left because he could not handle another child so soon. After finishing his education at Edna High School, he got a football scholarship to Wharton County Junior College followed by a full scholarship to the University of North Texas. He played originally as a linebacker before suffering a knee injury, prompting him to switch to play as a defensive end.

The first wrestling events Austin watched were those produced by Houston Wrestling and run by Paul Boesch, and Austin would later say, "I fell in love with the business when I was seven or eight years old. All I ever wanted to be was a professional wrestler. Wrestling was the biggest thing in my life." When he moved to attend university, he was living approximately 30 miles from the Dallas Sportatorium, a building he later described fondly as a "magnificent shithole of a building". It was here that World Class Championship Wrestling (WCCW) ran shows on a Friday night.

Professional wrestling career

Early career (1989–1990)
Deciding to become a wrestler, Austin joined "Gentleman" Chris Adams's school in the Dallas Sportatorium, where Adams also wrestled for WCCW. The first seminar cost Austin $45. Adams's training was purely technical, teaching Austin the moves, but nothing relating to kayfabe (still somewhat a guarded secret at the time) or business. Austin would later describe Adams as a "conman" who "didn't try to smarten [him] up or teach [him] the real deal when it came to wrestling". His first lesson in that came from Tony Falk, the referee in his 1989 televised WCCW debut against Frogman LeBlanc, who called the spots to lead him to a pinfall and a $40 payday.  Early influences on his career were the Von Erich family, Dusty Rhodes, and Ric Flair.

Initially working under his real name, he was renamed Steve Austin by Memphis booker Dutch Mantell during the merger of WCCW and the Continental Wrestling Association (CWA) into the United States Wrestling Association (USWA). The name change occurred to avoid confusion with "Dr. Death" Steve Williams, a well-known wrestler during that time. Austin later returned to Dallas, managed by Percy Pringle and accompanied by Jeannie Adams (Adams's ex-girlfriend and Austin's girlfriend at the time) and feuded with Adams and his wife Toni.

World Championship Wrestling

The Dangerous Alliance (1991–1992)

Arriving in WCW, he was now nicknamed "Stunning" Steve Austin, a name and gimmick he later said he could not commit to. Austin was originally paired with a valet named Vivacious Veronica but was later joined by Jeannie Adams, known as "Lady Blossom." Just weeks after his debut, Austin defeated Bobby Eaton for his first WCW World Television Championship on June 3, 1991, and later that year joined Paul E. Dangerously's Dangerous Alliance. Austin lost the WCW World Television Championship to Barry Windham in a two-out-of-three-falls match on April 27, 1992, but later regained the championship from Windham. He enjoyed a second lengthy reign as champion, before losing the championship to Ricky Steamboat, while The Dangerous Alliance disbanded shortly thereafter. At Halloween Havoc, Austin replaced Terry Gordy, teaming with "Dr. Death" Steve Williams to wrestle Dustin Rhodes and Windham for the unified WCW and NWA World Tag Team Championships. The teams wrestled to a thirty-minute time limit draw.

The Hollywood Blonds and The Stud Stable (1993–1995)

In October 1992, Austin formed a tag team known as The Hollywood Blonds with Brian Pillman, at the behest of lead booker Dusty Rhodes. Austin would later say that he was not excited about being placed into a tag team, as he was earmarked for a run with the WCW United States Heavyweight Championship with Harley Race as his manager. Initially billed under their individual personas, Pillman decided the pair needed their own finishing move, ring gear and team name, with travelling partner Scott Levy proposing The Hollywood Blonds, used in the 1970s by Buddy Roberts and Jerry Brown. The pair adopted an "old-style movie camera hand gesture", and informed opponents they had experienced a "brush with greatness".

On March 27, 1993, the team won the unified NWA and WCW World Tag Team Championship by defeating Ricky Steamboat and Shane Douglas, and held the championship for five months. In the main event of Clash of the Champions XXIII, the Blondes defended their championship against Ric Flair and Arn Anderson in a two-out-of-three-falls, where despite losing the first two falls, retained the championship as the second fall had been determined by a disqualification caused by Barry Windham. At Clash of the Champions XXIV, Austin and Pillman were scheduled to defend their championship against Anderson and Paul Roma but a legitimately injured Pillman was replaced by Steven Regal, with whom Austin lost to Anderson and Roma.

With Pillman still injured, Austin joined Colonel Robert Parker's Stud Stable. After Pillman returned, the team was broken up when Austin turned on him, a decision Austin describes as a "mystery". Austin defeated Pillman in a singles match at Clash of the Champions XXV. At Starrcade, Austin defeated Dustin Rhodes 2–0 in a two-out-of-three-falls match to win the United States championship. Austin lost the championship to Ricky Steamboat and was scheduled to face him in a rematch at Fall Brawl; Steamboat was though unable to wrestle due to a legitimate back injury and Austin was awarded the championship by forfeit. His second reign with the championship ended just five minutes later when he lost to Steamboat's replacement, Jim Duggan, in a match that lasted 35 seconds. Austin unsuccessfully challenged Duggan for the championship at both Halloween Havoc and Clash of the Champions XXIX. The influence of Hulk Hogan and the Hulkamania era was beginning to take hold in WCW, with vice president Eric Bischoff saying this was likely the reason Austin lost to Duggan, who had been a popular figure during that period of time. Around this time, Austin pitched a storyline idea to Bischoff in which it would be revealed that Austin was a family member of Hogan. The proposal was quickly turned down on account of Bischoff's belief that Hogan would not work with somebody such as Austin, who was not a proven name.

After returning from a knee injury in early 1995, Austin took part in a tournament for the vacant United States championship, defeating Duggan via countout in the first round but losing to Randy Savage in the quarter-final. In June 1995, Austin was fired by Bischoff after suffering a triceps injury while wrestling on a Japanese tour—Bischoff and WCW did not see Austin as a marketable wrestler. Additionally, Bischoff thought Austin was hard to work with.

Extreme Championship Wrestling (1995)

Austin was contacted by Paul Heyman of Extreme Championship Wrestling (ECW), who had previously managed him in WCW. Heyman hired him to do promos and in-ring interviews as he had not adequately recovered from his injury, paying Austin $500 a night. Changing his nickname to "Superstar", Austin debuted in ECW at Gangstas Paradise on September 18, 1995.

While in ECW, Austin used the platform to develop his future "Stone Cold" persona as well as a series of vignettes running down WCW in general and Bischoff in particular, most memorably in several promos that mocked his then-status as Nitro host by introducing Monday NyQuil, where he was joined by "Bongo" (a set of drums, meant to represent Steve "Mongo" McMichael) in promoting the show "where the big boys play with each other." Several wrestlers have credited ECW as the place where Austin developed his microphone skills. Austin has credited Heyman as the man who taught him how to cut a promo.

Whipwreck, who was the ECW World Heavyweight Champion at the time, defeated Austin to retain the championship at November to Remember. The Sandman defeated Austin and Whipwreck in a triple threat match at December to Dismember for the ECW World Heavyweight Championship.

World Wrestling Federation / World Wrestling Entertainment / WWE

The Ringmaster and birth of "Stone Cold" (1995–1996)
Austin joined the WWF in late-1995 after Diesel and Jim Ross helped convince WWF's owner Vince McMahon to hire him. He wrestled his first match for the WWF on December 18, 1995, which was broadcast on the January 8, 1996 episode of Raw. His debut saw him awarded the Million Dollar Championship by his manager, Ted DiBiase. Wrestling in his debut match on Raw he defeated Matt Hardy using the moniker "The Ringmaster". While making his first pay-per-view (PPV) appearance at the Royal Rumble, he was scripted to be among the final four wrestlers in the ring, which could have given him an early push; however, The Ringmaster failed to hang onto the ropes after Fatu clotheslined him over and slipped out of the ring early.

Austin soon thought the Ringmaster gimmick was weak and asked for a change. Having battled thinning hair for a few years, he decided to shave his head in early 1996. He later said in a 2017 interview, "After watching the Pulp Fiction movie with Bruce Willis, that's the haircut that inspired me. I was traveling on the road to Pittsburgh with Dustin Rhodes and before I went to the show, I said fuck it. I went into the bathroom with a razor blade and shaved all my hair off. Then I grew the goatee and everything came full circle." By March 11, The Ringmaster moniker (now merely a prefix to his ring name) would be discarded in favor of his most famous ring name, "Stone Cold" Steve Austin. The new name was prompted by his English wife at the time, Jeanie, who told him to drink a cup of tea she had made for him before it became "stone cold". His new persona was partially inspired by serial killer Richard Kuklinski.

Austin wrestled Savio Vega on Raw to a double countout, before defeating him in his first WrestleMania appearance at WrestleMania XII. At In Your House: Good Friends, Better Enemies, Austin lost to Vega in a rematch. At In Your House: Beware of Dog, Austin lost a Caribbean strap match to Vega, with the added stipulation that DiBiase was forced to leave the WWF as a result. DiBiase would later say that nobody foresaw the success Austin would have, and had advised him to ignore the advice given to him by producers and continue what he was doing as success required patience.

Austin 3:16 and rise to superstardom (1996–1997)

Austin's rise to stardom began at the 1996 King of the Ring, where he won the tournament by defeating Jake "The Snake" Roberts. At the time, Roberts was portraying a born-again Christian, which inspired Austin to ad-lib a famous promo during his coronation, mocking Roberts' religious faith and proclaiming the now-iconic catchphrase "Austin 3:16" as derision of the Bible verse John 3:16. Austin's win and rise to stardom proved to be an unexpected stroke of luck. Hunter Hearst Helmsley was originally scheduled to win the tournament, but plans changed as he was punished for taking part in the Curtain Call incident. "Austin 3:16" ultimately became one of the most popular catchphrases in wrestling history, and one of the best-selling T-shirts in WWE merchandise history.

After defeating Yokozuna at SummerSlam, throughout August and September Austin spoke about Bret Hart, challenging him constantly and taunting him relentlessly, before Hart finally returned on Raw to challenge Austin to a match at Survivor Series, which he accepted. During an episode of Superstars, old friend Brian Pillman conducted an interview with Austin regarding his upcoming match. After Pillman inadvertently complimented Hart, Austin grew angry and attacked him. He then proceeded to wedge Pillman's ankle in between a steel chair and stomp on it, breaking his ankle in storyline. It would lead to the infamous "Pillman's got a gun" segment on Raw wherein Austin broke into Pillman's home while he was nursing his injury. Pillman had been anticipating him and was armed with a pistol. Just as Austin broke in, Pillman aimed his gun at him before the episode cut to commercial break. The segment was highly controversial for its perceived violence and rare use of profanity in WWF programming. The segment is also credited for paving the way for WWF's shift to more mature programming. At Survivor Series, in a match to determine the number-one contender to the WWF Championship, Hart defeated Austin by using a turnbuckle to push himself backward while locked in the Million Dollar Dream.

During the 1997 Royal Rumble match, Austin was originally eliminated by Hart but the officials did not see it; he snuck back into the ring and eliminated Hart by throwing him over the ropes, winning the match. This led to the first-ever PPV main event of Austin's WWF career at In Your House 13: Final Four, where he competed in a four corners elimination match against Hart, The Undertaker, and Vader for the vacant WWF Championship. Austin was eliminated early from the match after injuring his knee; Hart would win the match and the championship. Hart lost the championship the next night on Raw to Sycho Sid due to Austin's interference, continuing their feud. At WrestleMania 13, Hart defeated Austin in a highly acclaimed submission match with Ken Shamrock as a special referee. During the match, Austin had been cut, and was bleeding profusely from his face, but he refused to tap out when Hart locked in his Sharpshooter, and finally passed out from excessive blood loss, losing the match. After the match, Hart continued to hold the Sharpshooter on Austin, who, despite his wounds, refused any assistance back to the locker room, thus turning Hart heel and Austin babyface in a rare double-turn. Austin portrayed an anti-hero instead of a traditional babyface, and he didn't embrace the fans at first either. Austin eventually got his revenge on Hart in the main event of In Your House 14: Revenge of the 'Taker, defeating him in a match to determine the next contender to The Undertaker's WWF Championship. Austin won when Hart was disqualified due to assistance from The British Bulldog. Austin faced Hart once again in a street fight on April 21 episode of Raw, injuring his opponent's leg with a steel chair during the bout. The match was ruled a no contest, but Austin proceeded to beat Hart while he was on a stretcher in the back of an ambulance. At In Your House 15: A Cold Day in Hell, Austin had The Undertaker down with the Stone Cold Stunner but was distracted by Pillman, allowing The Undertaker to recover and perform a Tombstone Piledriver for the victory.

On Raw, Austin partnered with the returning Shawn Michaels, as they both had a mutual enemy in the Harts. They defeated Owen Hart and The British Bulldog for the WWF Tag Team Championship, his first championship in the WWF. Despite being champions, the two constantly argued and ultimately faced each other in a match at King of the Ring, which ended in a double disqualification after both men attacked the referee. Michaels was later forced to vacate his championship due to an injury. Hart and Bulldog won a tournament to face Austin and a partner of his choice, but he refused to pick a partner and decided to face the duo by himself. Late in the match, a debuting Dude Love came out to offer assistance. Austin accepted and the duo won the match and the titles, making Austin a two-time tag team champion. Austin continued his feud with the Hart family, becoming embroiled in a heated rivalry particularly with Owen, who pinned a distracted Austin and secured victory for The Hart Foundation in the ten-man Tag Team match main event of In Your House 16: Canadian Stampede, where Austin was partnered with Ken Shamrock, Goldust, and The Legion of Doom.

At SummerSlam, Austin and Owen faced each other with the Intercontinental Championship on the line, with Owen adding a stipulation that Austin would have to kiss his buttocks if he lost. During the match, Owen botched a Tombstone Piledriver and dropped Austin on his head, resulting in a legitimate bruised spinal cord and temporary paralysis for Austin. As Owen stalled by baiting the audience, Austin managed to crawl over and pin Hart using a roll-up to win the championship. A visibly injured and dazed Austin was helped to his feet by several referees and led to the back. Due to the severity of his neck injury, Austin was forced to relinquish both championships. On September 22, on the first-ever Raw to be broadcast from Madison Square Garden, McMahon told Austin he wasn't physically cleared to compete, and after several weeks of build-up, Austin delivered his Stone Cold Stunner to McMahon, causing the fans in attendance to go ballistic. Austin was then arrested as part of the storyline, and was sidelined until Survivor Series. However, in the interim, he made several appearances, one being at Badd Blood where he was involved in the finish of a match between Owen and Faarooq for the vacant Intercontinental Championship. Austin hit Faarooq with the Intercontinental Championship belt while the referee's back was turned, causing Hart to win the match and the title. Austin's motive was to keep Owen as champion, as demonstrated when he interfered in Hart's matches on Raw. Austin regained the Intercontinental Championship from Hart at Survivor Series.

With Hart out of the way, Austin set his sights on The Rock, who stole Austin's championship belt after Austin suffered a beating by his Nation of Domination stablemates. In the weeks to come, The Rock began declaring himself to be "the best damn Intercontinental Champion ever." The Rock kept possession of the championship belt until D-Generation X: In Your House, when Austin defeated him to retain the championship and regain the belt. As Austin had used his pickup truck to aid his victory, McMahon ordered him to defend the championship against The Rock the next night on Raw. In an act of defiance, Austin forfeited the championship to The Rock before tossing the belt into the Piscataqua River.

Feud with Vince McMahon (1998–1999)
After Bret Hart's controversial departure for WCW, Austin and Michaels were the top stars in the company. Austin won the 1998 Royal Rumble, lastly eliminating The Rock. The next night on Raw, Austin interrupted Vince McMahon in his presentation of Mike Tyson, who was making a special appearance, over the objection of McMahon referring to Tyson as "the baddest man on the planet." Austin insulted Tyson by flipping him off, which led to Tyson shoving Austin much to McMahon's embarrassment, who began publicly to disapprove of the prospect of Austin as his champion. Tyson was later announced as "the special enforcer" for the main event at WrestleMania XIV, and aligned himself with Michaels's stable D-Generation X (DX). This led to Austin's WWF Championship match against Michaels at WrestleMania XIV, which he won with help from Tyson, who turned on DX by making the deciding three-count against Michaels and later hit him with his knock-out punch. This was Michaels's last match until 2002 as he had suffered two legitimate herniated discs and another completely crushed at the hands of The Undertaker in a casket match at the Royal Rumble. With Michaels's absence and Austin winning the WWF Championship, the "Austin Era" was ushered in.

On Raw the following night, McMahon presented him with a new championship belt and warned Austin that he did not approve of his rebellious nature, desiring a "corporate champion"; Austin responded with a Stone Cold Stunner, leading him being kayfabe arrested once again. The following week, it appeared as if Austin had agreed with McMahon, appearing in a suit and tie, before revealing it was a ruse and again attacking McMahon. On April 13, it appeared Austin and McMahon were going to battle out their differences in an actual match, but the match was declared a no-contest when Dude Love made an appearance. This led to a match between Dude Love and Austin at Unforgiven: In Your House, where Austin hit McMahon with a steel chair and went on to retain the title. The following month, Austin and Dude had a rematch at Over the Edge: In Your House for the WWF Championship. Austin managed to retain the championship despite McMahon acting as the self-appointed referee and his "Corporate Stooges" (Gerald Brisco and Pat Patterson) as timekeeper and ring announcer, respectively. McMahon continued to do everything he could to dethrone Austin as champion and he finally scored a big victory for his side at King of the Ring. Austin lost the WWF Championship to Kane in a First Blood match after The Undertaker accidentally hit him with a steel chair while the ref was incapacitated, despite Austin having knocked Kane unconscious and thwarted an earlier intervention by Mankind.

Austin further angered McMahon by winning back the championship the next night on Raw. Austin also emerged victorious against The Undertaker at SummerSlam. In response, McMahon set up a Triple Threat match at Breakdown: In Your House, where The Undertaker and Kane pinned Austin at the same time. McMahon decided to vacate the WWF Championship and award it based on a match between The Undertaker and Kane, in which Austin was the guest referee on Judgment Day: In Your House. Austin refused to count for either man and attacked both towards the end of the match. McMahon would, in storyline, fired him as result, although Austin got revenge by kidnapping McMahon and dragging him to the middle of the ring at "gunpoint", which ended up being a toy gun with a scroll that read "Bang! 3:16." During that segment, McMahon also learned that Austin was later re-signed by his son, Shane McMahon. In the semifinals of the Survivor Series tournament to crown a new WWF Champion, Austin lost to Mankind after Shane double-crossed Austin. The next night on Raw, Judge Mills Lane ruled that The Rock had to defend his newly won WWF Championship against Austin that night, as stipulated in the new contract Austin had signed two weeks earlier with Shane. The Undertaker interfered and hit Austin with a shovel, earning Austin a disqualification victory, meaning The Rock remained champion. At Rock Bottom: In Your House, Austin defeated The Undertaker in a Buried Alive match after Kane performed a Tombstone Piledriver on The Undertaker which sent him into the grave. With this victory, Austin qualified for the 1999 Royal Rumble. Austin's next appearance after this would be the January 4, 1999 edition of Raw, where he would come out to help Mankind defeat The Rock to become the WWF Champion by striking The Rock in the face with a steel chair and draping Mankind's body over him.

Austin's next chance to exact revenge on Mr. McMahon came during the Royal Rumble match. On Raw, McMahon drew Austin's entry number with the intention of screwing him over. Austin drew entry number one, while McMahon drew number two thanks to Commissioner Shawn Michaels. During the Royal Rumble match, Austin followed McMahon out of the ring and into the backstage area, only to be ambushed by members of The Corporation, and an injured Austin was taken to the hospital. Austin, however, returned in an ambulance and re-entered the match, delivering a Stone Cold Stunner to Big Boss Man and eliminating him. With the match down to Austin and McMahon, The Rock came down to the ring to distract Austin, who was eliminated by McMahon, thus McMahon winning the Royal Rumble.

McMahon turned down the number-one contender spot, and Michaels promptly awarded Austin the championship shot the next night on Raw. At St. Valentine's Day Massacre, Austin faced McMahon in a steel cage match, with the championship opportunity at WrestleMania XV at stake. During the match, Paul Wight made his WWF debut, coming from under the ring and attacking Austin, but Wight's attack propelled Austin into the side of the cage forcing the cage to give way and dropping Austin to the floor first, making him the victor. The week before WrestleMania, Austin interrupted The Rock, Vince, and Shane McMahon's interview segment by driving a beer truck to the ring and using a hose to spray the trio with beer. Austin defeated The Rock at WrestleMania XV to win his third WWF Championship. Austin faced The Rock in a rematch the following month at Backlash, in which Shane was the referee. During the match, Vince approached the ring, only to hand Austin back his Smoking Skull championship belt and take Shane out of the proceedings. Austin won the match when another referee made the count. Austin would lose the championship to The Undertaker at Over the Edge. Due to events revolving around Vince, Stephanie and Linda McMahon made Austin the chief executive officer (CEO) of the company as part of the storyline. Vince and Shane challenged Austin to a handicap ladder match at King of the Ring with the title of CEO on the line, which the McMahons won. The next night on Raw, Austin challenged and defeated The Undertaker to win his fourth WWF Championship. The two would compete in a "First Blood" match at Fully Loaded, with the stipulation that if Austin lost he would never compete for the WWF Championship again, but if Austin won, Vince would depart the company; Austin won after interference from X-Pac.

Championship reigns and The Alliance (1999–2001)

Austin held on to the WWF Championship until SummerSlam when he lost it to Mankind in a triple threat match also featuring Triple H. in the two months that followed, Triple H would gain possession of the title. In October, Austin would get his rematch at No Mercy against him, but Austin lost after The Rock accidentally struck him with a sledgehammer shot meant for Triple H. The three were advertised for a triple-threat match at Survivor Series, where Austin was run down by a car. The segment was to write him off television, with the neck injury suffered two years prior posing a real threat of early retirement, and was advised to undergo surgery. Austin would later describe this as "the worst storyline I was ever involved in".

During his recovery in April 2000, Austin made a one-off appearance at Backlash, attacking Triple H and Vince McMahon to help The Rock reclaim the WWF Championship. After Austin's official return at Unforgiven in September, Commissioner Mick Foley led an investigation to find out who ran Austin over, with the culprit revealed to be Rikishi. At No Mercy, Austin faced Rikishi in a No Holds Barred match, during which Austin attempted to run Rikishi down in a truck, but was prevented from doing so by officials, and the match was deemed a no contest; Austin was subsequently arrested. During a handicap match against Rikishi and Kurt Angle, Triple H came down with the apparent intention of teaming with Austin, only to hit Austin with a sledgehammer and reveal he had instructed Rikishi to run him over. At Survivor Series, Triple H aimed to run Austin down again during their match but his plot failed when Austin lifted Triple H's car with a forklift, then let it drop 20 feet. Austin won his third Royal Rumble match in January 2001, last eliminating Kane. His rivalry against Triple H ended at No Way Out in a Three Stages of Hell match, with Triple H defeating Austin two falls to one.

With The Rock defeating Angle for the WWF Championship at No Way Out, Austin was again set to face him at WrestleMania. In the weeks leading up to WrestleMania, animosity grew between Austin and The Rock, stemming from Austin's wife, Debra, being assigned to be The Rock's manager by Mr. McMahon. The match at WrestleMania X-Seven was made a no disqualification match. During the match, McMahon came to the ring, preventing The Rock from pinning Austin on two separate occasions and giving Austin a steel chair. Austin then hit The Rock several times with the chair before pinning him to win the WWF Championship for the fifth time. After the match, Austin shook hands with McMahon, turning heel for the first time since 1997. During a steel cage match with The Rock in a rematch for the WWF Championship the following night on Raw, Triple H came down to the ring with a sledgehammer. After teasing siding with The Rock, Triple H instead aligned himself with Austin and McMahon, attacking The Rock and put him out of action. Austin further cemented his heel turn the following Thursday on SmackDown!, when, during an interview with Jim Ross about his actions at WrestleMania, he thought Ross was denouncing their friendship and then assaulted Ross. Austin and Triple H became a team known as The Two-Man Power Trip. Austin altered his character considerably over the next few months by becoming a whiny, temperamental prima donna who complained incessantly when he felt he was not getting respect. He also developed a strange infatuation with McMahon, going to great lengths to impress him, even going so far as to hug him and bring him presents.

Austin and Triple H ran roughshod over all their opponents, until coming up against The Undertaker and Kane. After defeating them for the WWF Tag Team Championship at Backlash, they held the tag team titles, the WWF Championship (Austin) and the Intercontinental Championship (Triple H) all at once. On the May 21 episode of Raw, Austin and Triple H defended their tag team championship against Chris Jericho and Chris Benoit; during the match, Triple H tore his quadriceps, and the team lost the match and the tag team championship in a highly acclaimed bout, with Jim Ross saying the quartet created "magic", while wrestling journalist Dave Meltzer awarded the match four-and-a-three-quarter stars out of a possible five in his Wrestling Observer Newsletter. Austin officially broke up The Power Trip on that week's SmackDown!, criticizing Triple H for his injury and for hitting him with the sledgehammer. He continued to align himself with McMahon and began feuding with Jericho and Benoit by himself, leading to a triple-threat match at King of the Ring; despite interference from the debuting Booker T, Austin retained the championship.

Meanwhile, the purchase of WCW by Vince McMahon began to bear fruit as The Invasion began. Invading WCW wrestlers formed an alliance with a group of ECW wrestlers, with the group led by Shane and Stephanie McMahon. Vince called Austin out and demanded that he bring "the old Stone Cold" back so he could effectively captain a team of WWF wrestlers in a ten-man tag team match at the upcoming InVasion PPV in July. Austin initially refused, but on the following episode of Raw, he returned to his old ways and hit Stunners on every member of the Alliance, turning face once again. At InVasion, Austin captained the WWF team consisting of himself, Angle, Jericho, and The Undertaker and Kane against the team of WCW's Booker T and Diamond Dallas Page and ECW's Rhyno and The Dudley Boyz. Austin turned heel once again by hitting a Stunner on Angle and helping Team WCW/ECW win. Austin subsequently joined the Alliance as their leader.

Austin lost the WWF Championship to Angle at Unforgiven by submitting to the ankle lock, ending Austin's reign at 175 days, the longest reign since 1996. He would regain the title on the October 8 episode of Raw, when WWF Commissioner William Regal betrayed Angle and joined the Alliance. Austin then began feuding with Alliance member Rob Van Dam, who was the only member of the Alliance to be cheered by the fans, despite the villainous tactics of the group. Austin faced Angle and Van Dam at No Mercy later that month and retained the title by pinning Van Dam. For Survivor Series, a "winner takes all" 10-man tag team match was announced; Austin captained a team consisting Angle, Shane McMahon, Van Dam, and Booker T, against Team WWF; captained by The Rock, the team also included Jericho, Kane, The Undertaker and Big Show. At Survivor Series, Angle sided with the WWF, helping The Rock to hit the Rock Bottom and pin Austin to win the match, marking the end of the Invasion storyline.

The following night, Vince McMahon decided he was going to strip Austin of the championship and reward it to Angle, before Ric Flair returned and announced he was now co-owner of the company. Austin returned moments after this announcement and attacked Angle and McMahon for their actions. He was then handed his championship belt by Flair and celebrated with him in the ring, turning him face once again. At the Vengeance PPV, a tournament was held to unify the WWF Championship and the WCW World Heavyweight Championship, held by The Rock; also involving Angle and Jericho. Austin would defeat Angle, before losing the unification match to Jericho following interference by McMahon and Booker T.

Final feuds and retirement (2002–2003)
In the 2002 Royal Rumble on January 20, Austin entered at number nineteen and lasted until the final four, but was eliminated by Kurt Angle. On the January 28 episode of Raw, he defeated Angle to earn a shot at Chris Jericho's Undisputed WWF Championship at No Way Out. In the build-up to No Way Out, McMahon had signed the New World Order (nWo), who immediately began a feud with Austin. The nWo would make their debut at No Way Out. During the show, Austin refused a beer gift from the nWo, and they cost him his match against Jericho later that night. Problems were beginning to surface backstage, however, as Austin was unhappy regarding Hulk Hogan's return to the WWF. He was reported as refusing to lose to Hogan in a proposed match between the two at WrestleMania X8, while Hogan reportedly told McMahon the same regarding losing to Austin. In recent years, Austin claimed he didn't want the match as he didn't want to wrestle at a slower pace, and that he "didn't think we could deliver." Consequently, Austin would face and defeat Scott Hall at WrestleMania.

Austin no-showed the Raw after WrestleMania and took a week-long break without the company's consent, citing exhaustion. McMahon claimed his actions caused fury among fans who had paid to see him that night. Austin returned on the April 1 episode of Raw, the first of the new "brand extension" era. The show was centered around which show he would sign with, and he ultimately chose Raw. Austin entered a feud with The Undertaker that resulted in a number-one contender's match for the Undisputed WWF Championship at Backlash, which Austin lost despite having his foot on the rope when he was pinned. He would later be betrayed by Big Show after being put in a tag team match with him by Ric Flair, and was subsequently betrayed by Flair himself in the following weeks. Austin then defeated Big Show and Flair in a handicap match at Judgment Day. In a May 2002 interview on WWE's internet program, Byte This!, Austin stunned the company and fans by launching a verbal attack on the direction the company was heading in and slated the creative team for not using him the way he felt they previously did. The WWE rehired Eddie Guerrero for Austin to feud with, while also prepping Austin for a feud with Brock Lesnar. However, Austin balked at the proposition that he lose a King of the Ring qualifying match on Raw to Lesnar, and ultimately walked out of the company. Austin later explained that he thought hot-shotting a rookie made Austin look weak, and airing the match on free television with no build-up did not give Lesnar a proper stage for such a big win over a star of Austin's magnitude. Further fanning the flames amongst Austin's growing number of detractors was a well-publicized domestic dispute incident between Austin and his wife Debra (see below).

After Austin again no-showed the June 10 episode of Raw, his storylines were immediately dropped. Austin had walked out of the company again, publicly stating he felt bad storylines were presented to him by the creative team. This time his departure was for good. McMahon, along with longtime Austin supporter and real-life friend Jim Ross, buried Austin on WWE programming, referring to him as "taking his ball and going home" because he was not getting his way, whilst also explaining to the fans that neither he nor Ross was able to persuade Austin to change his mind. McMahon insisted that Austin owed an apology to all the fans across the world, especially those who paid solely to see him that night. McMahon toasted to Austin's career with a beer thanking him for all his hard work nonetheless. The same night, Austin's entrance theme was played during an in-ring segment by Flair, but it transitioned to Guerrero's theme and he entered the arena. The Rock also made an appearance on Raw that night, despite being drafted to SmackDown!, and announced his frustrations towards Austin and threw a can of beer at McMahon.

For the remainder of 2002, Austin kept a low profile and did not make any public appearances. It was reported, however, by the end of the year, that Austin and McMahon met and resolved their differences. He then agreed to return to the company in early 2003. In an interview with WWE Raw Magazine, he announced deep regret over the situation that led to his departure and the manner in which he had left, and deeper regret over inaccurate speculation regarding his alleged grudges held against other WWE wrestlers, claiming he had no problem with Hall rejoining the company. However, he admitted he still held strong reservations about his singles match with Hall at WrestleMania only lasting seven minutes and felt the build-up to the match did not live up to the expectations of his fans or Hall's, and was angered by speculation suggesting he disagreed with Kevin Nash re-joining the company, insisting he and Nash have always been good friends. He did, however, maintain his displeasure with the storylines and creative changes the WWE had imposed around the time of his departure. In an interview with Vince McMahon on his podcast in 2014, Austin publicly revealed for the first time that McMahon had fined him $650,000 upon his return, but he was able to lower the amount to $250,000.

Austin confessed he had a major rift with Triple H's role in the company upon his return in 2002 but insisted as of 2003, they resolved their issues. Also, he claimed a brief dispute with The Rock was resolved quickly upon his return, and that none of his disputes with the talent roster continued or played the major part in his departure. In February, Austin returned at No Way Out by defeating Eric Bischoff. Austin would wrestle only one match between then and WrestleMania, in another short match against Bischoff on Raw. He entered a feud with The Rock, who returned around the same time as a smug, Hollywood sell-out heel. The Rock was offended that the WWE fans voted for Austin in a WWE Magazine poll to determine the 'Superstar of the Decade'. He expressed his frustration at having never defeated Austin at WrestleMania, and challenged Austin to a match at WrestleMania XIX. Austin was then defeated by The Rock at WrestleMania XIX, in Austin's final match.

Part-time appearances (2005–2011)
On April 3, 2005, Austin made his first appearance on WWE programming in a year at WrestleMania 21 when he appeared with Roddy Piper on Piper's Pit. They were interrupted by Carlito, who received a Stone Cold Stunner. The segment ended with Austin and Piper celebrating with beer until Austin gave Piper a Stone Cold Stunner. Austin was involved in the concluding segment at ECW One Night Stand in which he had a beer bash with the ECW locker room and brawled with the anti-ECW invaders, led by Bischoff. He returned at Raw Homecoming, delivering Stone Cold Stunners to Vince, Shane, Stephanie, and Linda McMahon. An angle including Jim Ross being fired led to a match in which Austin agreed to face Jonathan Coachman at Taboo Tuesday, with the stipulation of Ross regaining his announcing job had Austin won and Austin losing his job had he lost. Austin hurt his back before the match and could not wrestle unless he was heavily medicated, so the match was cancelled. To explain away his failure to appear at Taboo Tuesday, Vince McMahon said on Raw that Austin had been involved in an accident, thus preventing him from competing. Batista substituted for Austin, defeating Coachman along with Vader and Goldust.

He returned to WWE to face John "Bradshaw" Layfield (JBL) in a beer-drinking contest at March 18, 2006, episode of Saturday Night's Main Event XXXII. Austin inducted Bret Hart into the WWE Hall of Fame on April 1, 2006.

Austin returned to WWE programming in March 2007, partially to promote his starring role in the release of WWE Films' production The Condemned. On March 31, he inducted Jim Ross into the Hall of Fame. At WrestleMania 23, Austin was the special guest referee for the match between Bobby Lashley and Umaga. If Lashley lost, his manager Donald Trump's head would be shaved, and if Umaga lost, his manager Vince McMahon's head would be shaved. During the match, Austin delivered Stone Cold Stunners to Umaga, Vince McMahon, Shane McMahon, and Trump. Lashley won the match; Trump, Austin, and Lashley then shaved McMahon's head. Austin ended the show by hitting the Stone Cold Stunner on both Vince and Trump. He then appeared in a video on the June 11 episode of Raw as part of "Mr. McMahon's Appreciation Night", where he shared his thoughts on his past feuds with McMahon. Austin appeared on the August 18 episode of Saturday Night's Main Event, as a possible illegitimate child of McMahon. He hit McMahon and Coachman with Stone Cold Stunners before leaving. He appeared at SummerSlam to aid Matt Hardy in battling MVP in a beer-drinking contest. The match ended in a no-contest after Austin handed a beer to MVP and gave him the Stone Cold Stunner. Austin made another appearance at Cyber Sunday, where he guest refereed a World Heavyweight Championship match between Batista and The Undertaker. On the November 5 episode of Raw, Austin made an appearance to confront Santino Marella for criticizing The Condemned. The argument ended as Marella received a Stone Cold Stunner from Austin, who then walked backstage only to return with a Budweiser beer truck to hose down Marella and his valet Maria with beer. Austin appeared on the Raw 15th Anniversary special, attacking Vince McMahon.

On October 26, 2008, at Cyber Sunday, Austin was the special guest referee during a match between Batista and Chris Jericho for the World Heavyweight Championship. On January 12, 2009, on Raw, Austin was announced to be the first member of the Hall of Fame class of 2009. He was inducted by his long-term on-screen rival Vince McMahon, who referred to Austin as "the greatest WWE Superstar of all time". During the induction, Austin said he was officially closing the door on his wrestling career and starting a new chapter in his life. He would appear at WrestleMania 25 the next night, driving an ATV to the ring. Austin appeared as the guest host of Raw on March 15, 2010, moderating a contract signing between McMahon and Bret Hart for their match at WrestleMania XXVI.

In early 2011, Austin was announced as the head trainer and host for the revival of Tough Enough. On the March 7 episode of Raw, Austin interrupted the contract signing of the special guest referee for the Michael Cole and Jerry Lawler match at WrestleMania XXVII, originally scheduled to be JBL; Austin attacked JBL with a Stone Cold Stunner and signed the contract instead. Although Lawler won by submission, the Anonymous Raw General Manager reversed the decision and disqualified Lawler, claiming that Austin had "overstepped his authority." Austin appeared on Raw the following night with the cast from Tough Enough, while also getting into an altercation with The Miz and Alex Riley. On the June 6 episode of Raw, Austin appeared to declare Andy Leavine as the winner of Tough Enough. He also served as the special guest referee in the evening's tag team main event of John Cena and Alex Riley against The Miz and R-Truth, hitting Miz with a Stone Cold Stunner and aiding Cena. However, the Anonymous Raw General Manager awarding the match to The Miz and R-Truth via disqualification. Austin did not take kindly to his decision being overturned and gave Cole a Stone Cold Stunner, which was followed with an Attitude Adjustment by Cena. Austin and Cena closed the show with a beer bash. Austin later appeared as the special guest General Manager on the "WWE All-Stars" episode of Raw, during which he destroyed the Anonymous Raw General Manager's laptop by running over it with his ATV.

Sporadic appearances and one-off return to competition (2012–2022)
In July 2012, Austin was announced as the cover star of the special edition of the video game WWE '13. He then began a brief, verbal feud on Raw with fellow cover star CM Punk in the months leading to release.

Austin appeared at WrestleMania XXX on April 6, 2014, with Hulk Hogan and The Rock in the opening segment. Austin made an appearance on the October 19, 2015 episode of Raw, introducing The Undertaker and promoting the WrestleMania 32 event. Austin again appeared on Raw the following week, where he promoted the WWE 2K16 video game in a backstage segment. At WrestleMania 32 on April 3, 2016, Austin (alongside Mick Foley and Shawn Michaels) confronted The League of Nations, with Austin delivering Stone Cold Stunners to Rusev and King Barrett. While Austin was celebrating with Michaels and Foley, The New Day tried to convince Austin to dance with them in celebration. While Austin reluctantly danced along at first, he soon hit Xavier Woods with a Stone Cold Stunner.

During Raws 25th anniversary episode on January 22, 2018, Austin appeared and performed a Stone Cold Stunner on Shane and Vince McMahon.

On March 7, 2022, Kevin Owens invited Austin as a special guest on the KO Show at WrestleMania 38 following several promos where Owens disrespected Austin's native Texas, where WrestleMania 38 was scheduled to take place. The next day, Austin accepted the invite. At the end of WrestleMania 38 Night One, Owens revealed that the invite to talk on the KO Show was a ruse and that he actually wanted to fight Austin. He challenged Austin to a No Holds Barred match, which Austin accepted, marking his first wrestling match in WWE in over 19 years. He would go on to win after hitting Owens with a Stone Cold Stunner. After the match, Austin gave another Stone Cold Stunner to Owens and one to Byron Saxton before celebrating with his brother, Kevin. The match received positive reviews from critics, with Kevin Pantoja of 411Mania and John Canton of TJR Wrestling giving the match a rating of 3.5/5 and 3/5 stars, respectively. Both noted the high entertainment value of Austin's return, aside from the rating of the match itself. On Night Two of WrestleMania 38, after Mr. McMahon defeated Pat McAfee in an impromptu match, Austin made another appearance, giving Austin Theory a Stone Cold Stunner. He then began drinking beer with McMahon before hitting him with a Stone Cold Stunner, paying homage to how the majority of on-screen interactions between the two have ended. Austin then toasted with McAfee but hit him with a Stone Cold Stunner as well.

Professional wrestling style, persona, and legacy
Since his retirement in 2003, Austin has been widely regarded and cited as one of the greatest and most influential professional wrestlers of all time. Sports Illustrated ranked him third on their top 101 greatest wrestlers of all-time list. In 2020 SPORTbible ranked Austin as the greatest wrestler of all times. He has been described as the most influential wrestler in Raw history, and the poster boy for the Attitude Era. Several former world champions have named Austin as part of their "Mount Rushmore" of wrestling, including The Rock, The Undertaker, Hulk Hogan, Ric Flair, and John Cena, and a 2012 poll conducted by WWE saw Austin picked second on a fan voted version of the concept. When Vince McMahon inducted Austin into the WWE Hall of Fame in 2009, he referred to Austin as "the greatest WWE superstar of all time."

During his early years as a wrestler, Austin was a technical wrestler. However, after Owen Hart accidentally injured Austin's neck in 1997, Austin changed his style from technical to brawler. His most famous finishing move is the Stone Cold Stunner, and he credits Michael Hayes with introducing the move to him. Following his retirement, he gave permission to Kevin Owens to use the move as his own finisher, but both have downplayed comparisons between the two. During his time as The Ringmaster, he used the Million Dollar Dream as a finishing move since it was Ted DiBiase's finisher. During his time in WCW, Austin used the Stun Gun (a move innovated by Eddie Gilbert as the Hot Shot) and the Hollywood & Vine (a standing modified figure-four leglock) as his finishers.

Sporting a bald head and goatee, coupled with his ring attire which consisted of plain black trunks and boots, Austin relied solely on his personality to become popular. As "Stone Cold", Austin was portrayed on-screen as an anti-authority rebel who would consistently cuss and defy the company rules and guidelines of WWE Chairman Vince McMahon. One of Austin's taunts during the Attitude Era was to show the middle finger. To compliment his persona, Austin was the recipient of two additional nicknames, commentator and friend Jim Ross dubbed him "The Texas Rattlesnake" due to the character's "mannerisms, the motivation, the mindset, you can't trust this son of a bitch", while Austin later named himself "The Bionic Redneck" on account of the injuries he had suffered to his arms, neck and knees. Austin has said he is "eternally indebted" to Ross for helping his character become popular.

On both his podcasts Stone Cold credits Bret Hart as the wrestler who got him "over" the most, had most influence on his early wrestling style, and who he had his best matches with. Austin would later go on to induct Bret Hart into the WWE Hall of Fame.

In August 2001, he began using his catchphrase "What?" to interrupt wrestlers who were trying to speak and to allow fan participation chants. Audiences at WWE shows have since widely used this chant during performer promos, and Austin has stated his regret at inventing the chant.

Austin's entrance theme was composed by Jim Johnston, who said that in composing the song, he looked upon Austin's persona as an "ass-kicker guy who did not enter a room with subtlety. He needed something that reflected that". Looking to capture the unpredictable nature of the character, Johnston thought of using the sounds of a car crash and smashing glass, and recalled that he instantly felt the theme fit the character and that "it felt like it had already been his theme for years". Austin says the song was inspired by Rage Against the Machine's song "Bulls on Parade". The theme song was revamped in 2000, with the rock band Disturbed recording the new version, used for the first time at the Unforgiven PPV event in September. Austin's entrance theme is regarded as one of the greatest of all time, and one which defined the Attitude Era, while Disturbed's version has been described as one of the 10 most metal entrance songs.

Other media

Acting and hosting
Austin had guest roles on Celebrity Deathmatch and Seasons 4 and 5 of CBS's Nash Bridges, where he played San Francisco Police Department Inspector Jake Cage. He has appeared on V.I.P and Dilbert. His motion picture debut was in a supporting role as Guard Dunham in the 2005 remake of The Longest Yard. Austin had his first starring film role, as Jack Conrad, a dangerous convict awaiting execution in a Salvadoran prison, who takes part in an illegal deathmatch game that is being broadcast to the public in the 2007 action film The Condemned. In 2010, Austin appeared in The Expendables as Dan Paine, the right-hand man for the primary antagonist of the film James Munroe, played by Eric Roberts, and bodyguard with Gary Daniels who plays The Brit. Shortly after Austin re-teamed with Eric Roberts and Gary Daniels in Hunt to Kill. It was his last American theatrical release film until 2013. Austin appeared as Hugo Panzer on television series Chuck. He has also starred in Damage, The Stranger, Tactical Force, Knockout, Recoil, Maximum Conviction, and The Package.

In April 2013, Austin started a weekly podcast named The Steve Austin Show which is family-friendly, while his second podcast The Steve Austin Show – Unleashed! is more adult-oriented. As of May 2015, the podcasts averaged 793,000 downloads a week and had nearly 200 million overall downloads. In February 2018, Austin announced that the "Unleashed" version of the podcast had been dropped and merged with the family-friendly version in order to appeal to more sponsors. The podcast has also transitioned to a live broadcast for the WWE Network (podcasted after a short exclusivity period) with monthly specials since 2014. In November 2019, Austin began an interview segment on the WWE Network called the Broken Skull Sessions, taking its name from the ranch owned by Austin. The premiere episode featured The Undertaker.

Austin hosted the reality competition show Redneck Island on CMT, which began in June 2012 and concluded with its fifth season in April 2016. In July 2014, his reality competition show Steve Austin's Broken Skull Challenge premiered on CMT. The show entered into its fifth season in September 2017.

Filmography

Video games

Personal life
Austin played college football at the University of North Texas. Austin married his high school girlfriend Kathryn Burrhus on November 24, 1990. However, he later pursued a relationship with English wrestling manager Jeanie Clarke, with whom he was working. His marriage to Burrhus was annulled on August 7, 1992, and he married Clarke on December 18. They had two daughters, Stephanie (born 1992) and Cassidy (born 1996), before divorcing on May 10, 1999.

On September 13, 2000, Austin married wrestling manager Debra Marshall. On June 15, 2002, Marshall called the police to the couple's home. She told officers that Austin had hit her and then stormed out of the house before police arrived. An arrest warrant was issued by the Bexar County district attorney's office on August 12 and Austin handed himself in the following day, at which point he was charged with domestic abuse. He pleaded no contest on November 25, and was given a year's probation, a $1,000 fine, and ordered to carry out 80 hours of community service. In 2007, Marshall told Fox News that WWE knew of the abuse, but worked to keep her from revealing that Austin had hit her as it would cost the company millions of dollars. Austin responded to the incident in 2003 through WWE Raw Magazine, citing his regret over their relationship breaking down and stating his love for Marshall. He also ridiculed allegations that the incident was alcohol-related. He filed for divorce from Marshall on July 22, 2002, which was finalized on February 5, 2003.

In March 2003, During the hours leading up to Wrestlemania 19, Austin was rushed to the hospital for twitchiness and a high heart rate.

In 2003, Austin denied allegations that he was an alcoholic, stating that wrestling fans had mistaken his character's excessive consumption of beer as a real-life trait of his and insisting that he drinks responsibly. In March 2004, he was accused of assaulting his then-girlfriend Tess Broussard during a dispute at his home in San Antonio, Texas, according to a police report. No arrests were made and no charges were filed in the case.

In 2007, the Wrestling Observer newsletter reported that Austin had legally changed his name to Steve Austin.

In late 2009, Austin married his fourth wife, Kristin Feres.

In 2014, Austin voiced support for same-sex marriage on his podcast. Also in 2014, Austin released his first beer, Broken Skull IPA, with El Segundo Brewing Company in California. In March 2022, they released another collaboration, Broken Skull American Lager. The beers are distributed in 35 states with El Segundo brewing over 5,000 barrels of Broken Skull annually. In 2022 & 2023, news outlets reported on Austin's recommitted health and workout routine, furthering speculation he will return to Wrestlemania.

Championships and accomplishments

 Cauliflower Alley Club
 Iron Mike Mazurki Award (2012)
 Guinness World Records
 World record: Most wins of the WWE Royal Rumble (3 times)
International Professional Wrestling Hall of Fame
Class of 2022
 Pro Wrestling Illustrated
 Feud of the Year (1998, 1999) vs. Vince McMahon
 Match of the Year (1997) vs. Bret Hart in a submission match at WrestleMania 13
 Most Hated Wrestler of the Year (2001)
 Most Popular Wrestler of the Year (1998)
 Rookie of the Year (1990)
 Wrestler of the Year (1998, 1999, 2001)
 Ranked No. 1 of the top 500 singles wrestlers in the PWI 500 in 1998 and 1999
 Ranked No. 19 of the top 500 singles wrestlers of the PWI Years in 2003
 Ranked No. 50 of the top 100 tag teams of the PWI Years with Brian Pillman in 2003
 Stanley Weston Award (2019)
 Professional Wrestling Hall of Fame
 Class of 2016
Texas Wrestling Federation
 TWA Tag Team Championship (1 time) – with Rod Price
 World Championship Wrestling
 WCW World Television Championship (2 times)
 WCW United States Heavyweight Championship (2 times)
 WCW World Tag Team Championship (1 time) – with Brian Pillman
 NWA World Tag Team Championship (1 time) – with Brian Pillman
 World Wrestling Federation/World Wrestling Entertainment/WWE
 WWF Championship (6 times)
 WWF Intercontinental Championship (2 times)
 WWF Tag Team Championship (4 times) – with Shawn Michaels (1), Dude Love (1), The Undertaker (1), and Triple H (1)
 Million Dollar Championship (1 time)
 King of the Ring (1996)
 Royal Rumble (1997, 1998, 2001)
Undisputed WWF Championship #1 Contenders Tournament (2002)
 Fifth Triple Crown Champion
 Slammy Award (2 times)
 Freedom of Speech (1997)
 Best Original WWE Network Show –  (2015)
 WWE Hall of Fame (Class of 2009)
 Wrestling Observer Newsletter
 Best Box Office Draw (1998, 1999)
 Best Brawler (2001)
 Best Gimmick (1997, 1998)
 Best Heel (1996)
 Best on Interviews (1996–1998, 2001)
 Best Non-Wrestler (2003)
 Feud of the Year (1997) 
 Feud of the Year (1998, 1999) 
 Match of the Year (1997) 
 Most Charismatic (1997, 1998)
 Rookie of the Year (1990)
 Tag Team of the Year (1993) 
 Worst Worked Match of the Year (1991) 
 Wrestler of the Year (1998)
 Wrestling Observer Newsletter Hall of Fame (Class of 2000)

References

Bibliography

External links

 
 The Steve Austin Show on PodcastOne
 
 
 

|-

1964 births
20th-century American male actors
20th-century professional wrestlers
21st-century American male actors
21st-century professional wrestlers
American agnostics
American male film actors
American male professional wrestlers
American male television actors
American male voice actors
American people convicted of assault
American people of English descent
American people of German descent
American people of Irish descent
American people of Swedish descent
American podcasters
American sportspeople convicted of crimes
American television hosts
Articles containing video clips
Living people
Male actors from Austin, Texas
Male actors from California
Male actors from Los Angeles
Male actors from San Antonio
Male actors from Texas
Million Dollar Champions
NWA/WCW World Television Champions
NWA/WCW/WWE United States Heavyweight Champions
North Texas Mean Green football players
People from Edna, Texas
People from McMullen County, Texas
People from Victoria, Texas
Professional Wrestling Hall of Fame and Museum
Professional wrestlers from California
Professional wrestlers from Texas
Professional wrestling authority figures
Professional wrestling podcasters
Sportspeople from Austin, Texas
Sportspeople from Los Angeles
Sportspeople from San Antonio
Texas culture
The Dangerous Alliance members
The Million Dollar Corporation members
The Stud Stable members
University of North Texas alumni
WCW World Tag Team Champions
WWE Champions
WWE Hall of Fame inductees
WWF/WWE Intercontinental Champions
WWF/WWE King Crown's Champions/King of the Ring winners